KCC Malls is a chain of shopping malls originated in Koronadal, South Cotabato, Philippines. It is owned by Koronadal Commercial Corporation and their headquarters is situated in General Santos. KCC currently has 4 Malls in operation in General Santos, Koronadal and Zamboanga City.

History

Koronadal Commercial Center (KCC) started in 1947 as a textile store in Koronadal City. It was the time when Koronadal was on its rapid commercialisation and became the capital of South Cotabato. It then expanded in 1989 as a supermarket and department store and branded as KCC Shopping Center.

In 1992, KCC expanded their operations with their second branch in General Santos as KCC Warehouse Plaza, which was later renamed as KCC Mall of GenSan in 1996. While in year 2000, the KCC Shopping Center in Koronadal was then became the KCC Mall of Marbel.

In 2012, their branch in General Santos made an expansion of an additional 21,450 square meters and was later called as Veranza by KCC or simply Veranza Mall with an Al-Fresco dining strip, additional stores, and an activity center.

With their growing profitability over the cities of Koronadal and General Santos, KCC then ventured for their expansion in other cities within Mindanao.

On December 10, 2015, KCC Mall De Zamboanga was opened and had set to become the second largest mall in Mindanao in terms of GFA.

Last October 28, 2018, their fifth mall, KCC Mall of Cotabato had ground broke on its 11 hectares prime lot area, the design of the mall reveals that it has a 6 level malls. The construction started last July 1, 2020. The target construction period for the phase one (Mall Construction) is 20 to 24 months, due to pandemic the target date of opening is moved to 2023 or 2024, after the completion of the mall, the construction will proceed to phase 2 which is the construction of 11 storey hotel and a convention center. Upon its completion, KCC Mall of Cotabato will be the largest KCC Mall on its opening date and the 2nd largest mall in Mindanao.

Branches

Existing malls

Future malls

Gallery

References

Retail companies of the Philippines
Companies based in General Santos
Real estate companies established in 1947
Retail companies established in 1947
Philippine companies established in 1947